Brachychilus chevrolatii is a species of beetle in the family Cerambycidae. It was described by James Thomson in 1868. It is known from Chile.

References

Phacellini
Beetles described in 1868
Beetles of South America
Endemic fauna of Chile
Arthropods of Chile